Sacrifice play may refer to:

 Sacrifice fly, in baseball
 Bunt (baseball), in baseball
 Sacrifice (chess), in chess
 Coup (bridge), a play in the card game contract bridge
 Hold up (bridge), a play in the card game contract bridge

See also
 Sacrifice (disambiguation)